The Great Gulf is a glacial cirque, or amphitheater-like valley head formed from a glacier by erosion, located in the White Mountains of New Hampshire. The cirque's walls are formed, from south to north, by the mountainsides of Mount Washington (6,288 ft/1917 m), Mount Clay (5,533 ft/1686 m), Mount Jefferson (5,716 ft/1742 m), Mount Adams (5,799 ft/1768 m), and Mount Madison (5,366 ft/1636 m). It is drained by the West Branch of the Peabody River.

The Great Gulf Wilderness is a protected wilderness area encompassing the cirque of the Great Gulf, and is part of the National Wilderness Preservation System.  Established in 1964, Great Gulf is New Hampshire's oldest and smallest wilderness area, comprising just .

See also
List of U.S. Wilderness Areas
Wilderness Act

References
Daniell, Gene, and Smith, Steven D. White Mountain Guide. 27th ed. AMC Books, 2003. .

External links
Great Gulf Wilderness - Wilderness.net
The Great Gulf Wilderness - GORP

Landforms of Coös County, New Hampshire
Mount Washington (New Hampshire)
Cirques of the United States
Landforms of New Hampshire